Marshal (or Marshall) Turner Adams (September 25, 1886 - October 27, 1987) was an American politician. He was a member of the Mississippi State Senate from the 31st District from 1916 to 1920.

Biography 
Marshal Turner Adams was born on September 25, 1886, in Chesterville, Pontotoc County, Mississippi. He was the son of George Turner Adams, who was a farmer and merchant; and Emma Jane (Carruth) Adams. Adams attended the public schools of Pontotoc County and neighboring Lee County. From 1903 to 1907, Adams attended a college preparatory school in McKenzie, Tennessee. He began attending the University of Mississippi in 1907 and entered the school's Law Department in 1909. From 1908 to 1910, Adams was a member of the university baseball team. He graduated with a Bachelor of Laws degree in 1911. After graduation, he moved to Pontotoc, Mississippi, and began practicing law there.

Political career and later life 
In 1915, Adams was elected to represent the 31st District as a Democrat in the Mississippi State Senate for the 1916-1920 term. In 1919, Adams was re-elected to this position and served in the 1920-1924 term. By the early 1930s, Adams served as a district attorney. By 1986, Adams was the oldest living alumnus of the University of Mississippi. Adams died at the age of 101 on October 27, 1987.

Personal life 
Adams was a Methodist and a member of the Freemasons. He was a member of the Sigma Chi fraternity. He married Willye Mae Fletcher in 1913. Adams had at least three children, whose names included Marshall Jr., George, and Aileen.

References 

1886 births
1987 deaths
20th-century American politicians
American centenarians
Mississippi lawyers
Democratic Party Mississippi state senators
People from Pontotoc, Mississippi
Ole Miss Rebels baseball players